Ramiro Julián Cáseres (born 9 January 1994) is an Argentine footballer who plays as a forward for Defensores de Belgrano.

Honours
Vélez Sársfield
Argentine Primera División (1): 2012 Inicial, 2012–13 Superfinal
Supercopa Argentina (1): 2013

External links
 Profile at Vélez Sarsfield's official website 
 Argentine Primera statistics at Fútbol XXI  
 

Living people
1994 births
Argentine footballers
Argentine expatriate footballers
Association football forwards
Club Atlético Vélez Sarsfield footballers
Gimnasia y Esgrima de Jujuy footballers
Club Deportivo Universidad de San Martín de Porres players
Club Atlético Platense footballers
Talleres de Remedios de Escalada footballers
Defensores de Belgrano footballers
Argentine Primera División players
Primera Nacional players
Peruvian Primera División players
Argentine expatriate sportspeople in Peru
Expatriate footballers in Peru
People from Ituzaingó Partido
Sportspeople from Buenos Aires Province